The Confederate order of battle during the Battle of Gettysburg includes the American Civil War officers and men of the Army of Northern Virginia (multiple commander names indicate command succession during the three-day battle (July 1–3, 1863)). Order of battle compiled from the army organization during the battle, the casualty returns and the reports.

Abbreviations used

Military rank
 Gen = General
 LTG = Lieutenant General
 MG = Major General
 BG = Brigadier General
 Col = Colonel
 Ltc = Lieutenant Colonel
 Maj = Major
 Cpt = Captain
 Lt = Lieutenant

Other
 (w) = wounded
 (mw) = mortally wounded
 (k) = killed in action
 (c) = captured

Army of Northern Virginia

General Robert E. Lee, Commanding

General Staff:
 Chief of Staff and Inspector General: Col Robert H. Chilton
 Chief of Artillery: BG William N. Pendleton
 Medical Director: Dr. Lafayette Guild
 Chief of Ordnance: Ltc Briscoe G. Baldwin
 Chief of Commissary: Ltc Robert G. Cole
 Chief Quartermaster: Ltc James L. Corley
 Judge Advocate General: Maj Henry E. Young
 Military Secretary and Acting Asst. Chief of Artillery: Col Armistead L. Long
 Asst. Inspector General: Col Henry L. Peyton
 Asst. Inspector General and Asst. Adjutant General: Maj Henry E. Young
 Asst. Inspector General and Asst. Adjutant General: Maj Giles B. Cook
 Aide de Camp and Asst. Adjutant General: Maj Walter H. Taylor
 Aide de Camp and Asst. Military Secretary: Maj Charles Marshall
 Aide de Camp and Asst. Inspector General: Maj Charles S. Venable
 Aide de Camp: Maj Thomas M. R. Talcott
 Aide de Camp: Lt George W. Peterkin
 Engineer: Col William P. Smith
 Engineer: Cpt Samuel R. Johnson

General Headquarters:
 Escort: 39th Virginia Cavalry Battalion (companies A & C)

First Corps

LTG James Longstreet, Commanding

General Staff:
 Chief of Staff: Ltc Moxley Sorrel (w)
 Signal Officer: Cpt Jacob H. Manning
 Quartermaster: Maj Samuel P. Mitchell
 Commissary and subsistence: Maj Raphael J. Moses
 Asst. Adjutant General & Asst. Inspector General: Maj Osmun Latrobe
 Asst. Adjutant General & Assistant Inspector General: Maj John Walter Fairfax
 Ordnance Officer: Lt. Col. Peyton T. Manning
 Engineer: Maj John J. Clarke
 Aide de Camp: Cpt Thomas J. Goree
 Medical Director: Dr. John S. D. Cullen

Second Corps

LTG Richard S. Ewell, Commanding

General Staff:
 Supernumerary: MG Isaac R. Trimble
 Chief of Staff: Ltc Charles J. Faulkner
 Asst. Adjutant General: Maj Alexander S. Pendleton
 Asst. Adjutant General: Maj George C. Brown
 Aide de Camp: Cpt James P. Smith
 Aide de Camp: Lt Thomas T. Turner
 Asst. Adjutant General & Asst. Inspector General: Col Abner Smead
 Asst. Inspector General: Maj Benjamin H. Green
 Asst. Quartermaster: Maj John A. Harman
 Commissaries and subsistence: Maj Wells J. Hawks
 Engineer: Cpt Henry B. Richardson (w&c)
 Topographical engineer: Cpt Jedediah Hotchkiss
 Ordnance: Maj William Allen
 Signal Officer: Cpt Richard E. Wilbourn
 Medical Director: Dr. Hunter H. McGuire
 Escort: Randolph's Company Virginia Cavalry, Cpt William F. Randolph
 Provost Guard: 1st North Carolina Battalion Sharpshooters

Third Corps

LTG Ambrose P. Hill, Commanding

General Staff:
 Chief of Staff: Maj William H. Palmer
 Signal Officer: Cpt Richard H. T. Adams

Cavalry units

Notes

References
 U.S. War Department, The War of the Rebellion: a Compilation of the Official Records of the Union and Confederate Armies, U.S. Government Printing Office, 1880–1901.
 Gettysburg National Military Park - The Army of Northern Virginia at Gettysburg
 Civil War Trust - Gettysburg Confederate order of battle
 Civilwarhome - Gettysburg Confederate order of battle
 Gettysburg Discussion Group - Confederate order of battle
 Eicher, John H. Gettysburg Order of Battle at Gettysburg Discussion Group website.

External links

American Civil War orders of battle